The 2017 Swedish Open was a tennis tournament played on outdoor clay courts as part of the ATP World Tour 250 Series of the 2017 ATP World Tour and as part of the International Series on the 2017 WTA Tour. It took place in Båstad, Sweden, from 17 through 23 July 2017 for the men's tournament, and from 24 through 30 July 2017 for the women's tournament. It is also known as the 2017 SkiStar Swedish Open for the men and the 2017 Ericsson Open for the women for sponsorship reasons. It was the 70th edition of the event for the men and the 9th edition for the women.

Points and prize money

Point distribution

Prize money 

1 Qualifiers prize money is also the Round of 32 prize money
* per team

ATP singles main-draw entrants

Seeds 

 1 Rankings are as of July 3, 2017

Other entrants 
The following players received wildcards into the singles main draw:
  Tommy Haas
  Elias Ymer
  Mikael Ymer

The following player received entry using a protected ranking:
  Ernests Gulbis

The following players received entry from the qualifying draw:
  Arthur De Greef
  Federico Delbonis 
  Maximilian Marterer 
  Leonardo Mayer

The following player received entry as a lucky loser:
  Paul-Henri Mathieu

Withdrawals 
Before the tournament
  Nicolás Almagro →replaced by  Facundo Bagnis
  Jérémy Chardy →replaced by  Paul-Henri Mathieu
  Steve Darcis →replaced by  Alexandr Dolgopolov
  Richard Gasquet →replaced by  Henri Laaksonen
  Viktor Troicki →replaced by  Renzo Olivo

Retirements 
  Pablo Carreño Busta

ATP doubles main-draw entrants

Seeds 

 Rankings are as of July 3, 2017

Other entrants 
The following pairs received wildcards into the doubles main draw:
  Johan Brunström /  Andreas Siljeström
  Elias Ymer /  Mikael Ymer

The following pair received entry as alternates:
  Isak Arvidsson /  Fred Simonsson

Withdrawals 
Before the tournament
  Jérémy Chardy

WTA singles main-draw entrants

Seeds 

 1 Rankings are as of July 17, 2017

Other entrants 
The following players received wildcards into the singles main draw:
  Mirjam Björklund
  Elizaveta Kulichkova
  Rebecca Peterson

The following players received entry from the qualifying draw:
  Irina Bara 
  Kateryna Kozlova 
  Barbora Krejčíková
  Cornelia Lister 
  Arantxa Rus 
  Martina Trevisan

The following player received entry as a lucky loser:
  Viktoriya Tomova

Withdrawals 
Before the tournament
  Timea Bacsinszky →replaced by  Anna Blinkova
  Sorana Cîrstea →replaced by  Patricia Maria Țig
  Anett Kontaveit →replaced by  Viktoriya Tomova
  Christina McHale →replaced by  Aleksandra Krunić
  Yulia Putintseva →replaced by  Annika Beck
  Samantha Stosur →replaced by  Pauline Parmentier

During the tournament
  Kiki Bertens

Retirements 
  Julia Görges

WTA doubles main-draw entrants

Seeds 

 1 Rankings are as of July 17, 2017

Other entrants 
The following pairs received wildcards into the doubles main draw:
  Mirjam Björklund /  Ida Jarlskog
  Jacqueline Cabaj Awad /  Kajsa Rinaldo Persson

The following pair received entry as alternates:
  Ellen Allgurin /  Karen Barritza

Withdrawals 
Before the tournament
  Danka Kovinić

Champions

Men's singles 

 David Ferrer def.   Alexandr Dolgopolov, 6–4, 6–4

Women's singles 

  Kateřina Siniaková def.  Caroline Wozniacki, 6–3, 6–4

Men's doubles 

  Julian Knowle /  Philipp Petzschner def.  Sander Arends /  Matwé Middelkoop, 6–2, 3–6, [10–7]

Women's doubles 

  Quirine Lemoine /  Arantxa Rus def.  María Irigoyen /  Barbora Krejčíková, 3–6, 6–3, [10–8]

References

External links 

 

Swedish Open
Swedish Open
Swedish Open
Swedish Open
July 2017 sports events in Europe